Gafur Gulberdiyev (Russian: Гафур Gulberdiyev born 23 August 1995) is a Turkmen footballer born in Istanbul and captain of FC Saxan in Moldova.

Career

He previously played for Mortágua FC, including when they attained promotion to the Campeonato de Portugal. In 2016, he signed for FC Saxan.

References

External links
 

Turkmenistan footballers
FC Saxan players
Footballers from Istanbul
Association football defenders
Expatriate footballers in Moldova
Turkmenistan expatriate sportspeople in Moldova
Expatriate footballers in Portugal
Living people
Moldovan Super Liga players
1995 births
Turkmenistan expatriate footballers